Aspen is a lake in Katrineholm Municipality, Södermanland, Sweden, and is part of Norrström's main catchment area. The lake is 11 meters deep, has an area of 1.32 square kilometers and is 48 metres above sea level. The lake is dewatered by the river Aspern which carries its water 4 km west to Öljaren.

Lakes of Södermanland County